Mohamed Faizal Mohamed Abdul Kadir  PPA SC (born 1980) is a Singaporean lawyer.

Education 

Mohamed Faizal graduated from the National University of Singapore Faculty of Law with a first class honours LLB in 2005. Mohamed Faizal subsequently received his LLM from Harvard Law School in 2009. His thesis written at Harvard Law School was awarded the Gold Medal Prize by the International Insolvency Institute.

Legal career 

After graduation from the National University of Singapore Faculty of Law, Mohamed Faizal served as a Justices' Law Clerk and Assistant Registrar of the Supreme Court of Singapore. Mohamed Faizal is at the Attorney-General's Chambers, where he was previously Deputy Chief Prosecutor and is now Second Chief Prosecutor. He was also previously in the Singapore Medical Council.

One of the cases managed by Mohamed Faizal was the prosecution of Gaiyathiri Murugayan for the abuse and murder of her Myanmar maid Piang Ngaih Don, who died in July 2016. Gaiyathiri was initially charged with intentional murder before the charge was reduced to culpable homicide not amounting to murder due to her psychiatric disorders; she also faced more than a hundred charges of causing various degrees of hurt (ranging from hurt to grievous hurt) to the maid. Mohamed Faizal sought the maximum sentence of life imprisonment (or at least 27 years' jail) for Gaiyathiri, labelling her conduct as cruel and heinous, describing the case of Piang's death as a shocking case without parallel. Gaiyathiri was in the end sentenced to 30 years' imprisonment on 22 June 2021.

Mohamed Faizal was also involved in the appeal against the sentences of Azlin Arujunah and Ridzuan Mega Abdul Rahman for the 2016 fatal abuse and murder of their five-year-old son; the couple were earlier acquitted of murder and sentenced to 27 years in prison for child abuse and causing grievous hurt. Senior counsel Goh Yihan was appointed by the Court of Appeal as amicus curiae for the case. Mohamed Faizal successfully convinced the Court of Appeal to find Azlin guilty of murder and increase Ridzuan's sentence to life imprisonment on 12 July 2022. Although Mohamed Faizal argued for the death penalty, Azlin was sentenced to life imprisonment for her son's murder three months later by the Court of Appeal.

Mohamed Faizal was also general editor of the Criminal Procedure Code of Singapore - Annotations and Commentary published in 2012.

Professional Appointments 

Mohamed Faizal sits on the MUIS Appeal Board, the board of Advisory.SG and the Silent Heroes Awards. He was also on the Editorial Board of the New York International Law Review. Mohamed Faizal has also served on various committees such as the Committee for University Education Places 2015 and the Eldershield Review Committee.

Mohamed Faizal is a principal mediator with the Singapore Mediation Centre. He had held adjunct teaching positions in the National University of Singapore Faculty of Law and has also been involved in numerous training initiatives, including mediation and negotiation courses.

Awards 

Mohamed Faizal received the Public Administration Medal (Bronze) in 2014. He also received the Association of Conflict Resolution's International Outstanding Leadership Award.

Mohamed Faizal was awarded the President's Volunteerism & Philanthropy Award in 2015 by the President of Singapore for his work on developing scholarships for lower-income students. Mohamed Faizal also founded the Phoenix Grant at NUS Faculty of Law. In 2016, Mohamed Faizal was appointed as a Young Global Leader by the World Economic Forum.

Mohamed Faizal is listed in The 500 Most Influential Muslims, an annual international publication, as one of the 500 Most Influential Muslims in the World.

Mohamed Faizal was appointed Senior Counsel in January 2020, the first Malay-Muslim in Singapore to be so appointed. He received the Berita Harian Achiever of the Year Award that same year for his achievements in the legal profession and his contributions to community causes.

References 

Living people
National University of Singapore alumni
Harvard Law School alumni
Recipients of the Pingat Pentadbiran Awam
Singaporean Senior Counsel
21st-century Singaporean lawyers
1980 births